Terchey is a village in the Leh district of Ladakh, India. It is located in the Nubra tehsil.

Demographics
According to the 2011 census of India, Terchey has 57 households. The effective literacy rate (i.e. the literacy rate of population excluding children aged 6 and below) is 62%.

References

Villages in Nubra tehsil